Giovanni Gaspari (born 6 June 1963) is an Italian priest of the Catholic Church who has worked in the diplomatic service of the Holy See since 2001. He was named Apostolic Nuncio to Angola and to São Tomé and Príncipe in September 2020.

Biography
Giovanni Gaspari was born on 6 June 1963, in Pescara. He was ordained a priest of the Archdiocese of Pescara–Penne on 4 July 1987 by Archbishop Antonio Iannucci. His assignments in that diocese included stints as the archbishop's secretary, head of the vocations center, spiritual director of the minor seminary, and chancellor of the archdiocese.

To prepare for a diplomatic career he entered the Pontifical Ecclesiastical Academy in 1998. He has earned a degree in canon law and a licentiate in moral theology. He joined the diplomatic service of the Holy See on 1 July 2001, and served in diplomatic missions in the pontifical representations to Iran, Albania, Mexico, and Lithuania, as well as in the Vatican Secretariat of State.

On 21 September 2020, Pope Francis named him Apostolic Nuncio to Angola and to São Tomé and Príncipe. He made him titular archbishop of Alba Maritima at the same time.

See also
 List of heads of the diplomatic missions of the Holy See

References

External links
 Catholic Hierarchy: Father Giovanni Gaspari 

Apostolic Nuncios to Angola
Apostolic Nuncios to São Tomé and Príncipe
Living people
People from Pescara
Pontifical Ecclesiastical Academy alumni

1963 births